Shoun may refer to:

 Anna Shoun, a character in the British television series Star Cops
 Clyde Shoun (1912-1968), a professional baseball player
 John Shoun the blessed (died 1619)
 Prince Shōun, a Japanese prince and Buddhist priest
 Yamamoto Shōun (1870-1965), a Japanese artist